Events from the year 1576 in France

Incumbents
 Monarch – Henry III

Events
6 May – Edict of Beaulieu

Births

Full date missing
Salomon de Caus, Huguenot engineer (died 1626)
Jean Ogier de Gombauld, playwright (died 1666)
Bucherius, Jesuit and chronological scholar (died 1665)

Deaths

Full date missing
Adam de Craponne, engineer (born 1526)
John III, Count of Ligny, nobleman

See also

References

1570s in France